David Joby Sanchez (born June 24, 1991) is an American professional mixed martial artist who competes in the bantamweight division of the Legacy Fighting Alliance. A professional mixed martial artist since 2011, Sanchez has also competed in the Ultimate Fighting Championship.

Background
Born and raised in Albuquerque, New Mexico, Sanchez started kickboxing at the age of seven, then began training Kajukenbo at the age of 10. He was a standout wrestler in high school at valley high school finishing as state runner-up in his weight division as a senior. Sanchez attended Central New Mexico Community College, where and became certified as an EMT.

Mixed martial arts career

Early career
Sanchez began competing as an amateur in mixed martial arts in 2009 and made his professional debut in 2011 competing in regional promotions primarily as a bantamweight in his home state of New Mexico. He compiled an undefeated record of 6-0, before signing with the UFC in the summer of 2014 on the heels of TKO stoppage victory over Antonio Banuelos.

Ultimate Fighting Championship
Sanchez made his promotional debut as a short notice replacement against Wilson Reis on August 23, 2014 at UFC Fight Night 49, filling in for an injured Tim Elliott. He lost the fight by unanimous decision.

Sanchez faced Tateki Matsuda on January 18, 2015 at UFC Fight Night 59.  Sanchez defeated Matsuda in a back and forth fight via split decision.

Sanchez was expected to face Justin Scoggins on December 11, 2015 at The Ultimate Fighter 22 Finale. However, Scoggins pulled out of the fight in the week leading up to the event and was replaced by Geane Herrera.  After a back-and-forth two rounds, Sanchez lost the bout via TKO in the end of the second round and was subsequently released from the promotion.

After re-signing with the UFC, Sanchez faced Roberto Sanchez on February 18, 2018 at UFC Fight Night: Cowboy vs. Medeiros. He lost the fight in the first round by submission.

Sanchez faced Mark De La Rosa on November 10, 2018 replacing Jordan Espinosa, at UFC Fight Night 139. He lost the fight via split decision.

Post-UFC career
After being cut from the UFC, Sanchez signed a contract with Legacy Fighting Alliance, making his debut against Demetrius Wilson at LFA 58 on January 25, 2019. Sanchez won the fight via unanimous decision.

Sanchez fought Brandon Royval at LFA 65 on May 3, 2019, losing the bout via submission due to an armbar in the first round.

Stepping in to replace injured Andre Morera, Sanchez headlined Combate Americas' event against José Alday on October 11, 2019. Sanchez won the back-and-forth bout via unanimous decision.

Sanchez was expected to face Dani Barez at a Combate Americas' event on December 7, 2019. However, Sanchez withdrew from the bout citing an injury.

Mixed martial arts record

|-
| Win
| align=center| 13–5
| José Alday
| Decision (unanimous)
| Combate 46: Tucson
| 
| align=center| 3
| align=center| 5:00
| Tucson, Arizona, United States
| Bantamweight bout.
|-
| Loss
| align=center| 12–5
| Brandon Royval
| Submission (armbar)
| Legacy Fighting Alliance 65
| 
| align=center| 1
| align=center| 3:17
| Vail, Colorado, United States
|  
|-
| Win
| align=center| 12–4
| Demetrius Wilson
| Decision (unanimous)
| Legacy Fighting Alliance 58
| 
| align=center| 3
| align=center| 5:00
| Albuquerque, New Mexico, United States
| 
|-
|Loss
|align=center|11–4
|Mark De La Rosa
|Decision (split)
|UFC Fight Night: Korean Zombie vs. Rodríguez 
|
|align=center|3
|align=center|5:00
|Denver, Colorado, United States
| 
|-
|Loss
|align=center|11–3
|Roberto Sanchez
|Submission (rear-naked choke)
|UFC Fight Night: Cowboy vs. Medeiros
|
|align=center|1
|align=center|1:50
|Austin, Texas, United States
|
|-
|Win
|align=center|11–2
|JP Buys
|TKO (punches)
|Dana White's Contender Series 7 
|
|align=center|2
|align=center|2:28
|Las Vegas, Nevada, United States
|
|-
|Win
|align=center|10–2
|Manny Vazquez
|Decision (unanimous)
|Dana White's Contender Series 1
|
|align=center|3
|align=center|5:00
|Las Vegas, Nevada, United States
|
|-
|Win
|align=center|9–2
|Jesus Urbina
|Decision (split)
|Jackson-Wink Fight Night 1
|
|align=center|3
|align=center|5:00
|Albuquerque, New Mexico, United States
|
|-
|Win
|align=center|8–2
|Martin Sandoval
|Submission (D'Arce choke)
|Global Knockout 7
|
|align=center|2
|align=center|3:19
|Jackson, California, United States
|
|-
|Loss
|align=center|7–2
|Geane Herrera
|TKO (punches)
|The Ultimate Fighter: Team McGregor vs. Team Faber Finale
|
|align=center|2
|align=center|4:28
|Las Vegas, Nevada, United States
|   
|-
|Win
|align=center|7–1
|Tateki Matsuda
|Decision (split)
|UFC Fight Night: McGregor vs. Siver
|
|align=center|3
|align=center|5:00
|Boston, Massachusetts, United States
|
|-
| Loss
|align=center| 6–1
|Wilson Reis
| Decision (unanimous)
|UFC Fight Night: Henderson vs. dos Anjos
|
|align=center|3
|align=center|5:00
|Tulsa, Oklahoma, United States
|
|-
|Win
|align=center| 6–0
|Antonio Banuelos
|TKO (corner stoppage)
|Tachi Palace Fights 20
|
|align=center| 2
|align=center| 2:41
|Lemoore, California, United States
| 
|-
|Win
|align=center| 5–0
|Eric Moell
|TKO (punches and elbows)
|XFC 25
|
|align=center| 1
|align=center| 3:25
|Albuquerque, New Mexico, United States
|
|-
|Win
|align=center| 4–0
|Christopher Dunn
|Submission (triangle choke)
|XFC 20
|
|align=center| 1
|align=center| 1:49
|Knoxville, Tennessee, United States
|
|-
| Win
|align=center| 3–0
|Daniel Armendariz
| Submission (rear-naked choke)
|KOTC: Night Stalker
|
|align=center|2
|align=center|2:42
|Santa Fe, New Mexico, United States
|
|-
| Win
|align=center| 2–0
|Ron White
| Submission (rear-naked choke)
|Cherokee Street: United MMA Bash
|
|align=center|2
|align=center|1:13
|Albuquerque, New Mexico, United States
|
|-
| Win
|align=center| 1–0
|Matt Madrid
| TKO (punches)
|ECSC: Friday Night Fights 2
|
|align=center|3
|align=center|2:45
|Clovis, New Mexico, United States
|
|-

See also
 List of male mixed martial artists

References

External links

Living people
1991 births
American practitioners of Brazilian jiu-jitsu
American kajukenbo practitioners
American male mixed martial artists
Mixed martial artists from New Mexico
Sportspeople from Albuquerque, New Mexico
Flyweight mixed martial artists
Bantamweight mixed martial artists
Mixed martial artists utilizing kajukenbo
Mixed martial artists utilizing Brazilian jiu-jitsu
Ultimate Fighting Championship male fighters